Nymphargus ruizi (common name: Ruiz's Cochran frog) is a species of frog in the family Centrolenidae, formerly placed in Cochranella.
It is endemic to Colombia where it is known from the western slopes of the Cordillera Occidental and the eastern slopes of the Farallones de Cali. Its natural habitats are sub-Andean forests next to streams. It is threatened by habitat loss caused by agricultural expansion, logging, human settlement, and water pollution.

Nymphargus ruizi are relatively small frogs: adult males measure  in snout–vent length. The skin of the dorsum is smooth, with or without spinules. Vomerine teeth are absent.

References

ruizi
Amphibians of Colombia
Amphibians of the Andes
Endemic fauna of Colombia
Taxonomy articles created by Polbot
Amphibians described in 1993